Diptychophora lojanalis is a moth in the family Crambidae. It was described by Paul Dognin in 1905. It is found in Ecuador (Loja Province).

References

Diptychophorini
Moths described in 1905